There have been nine baronetcies created for persons with the surname Roberts, three in the Baronetage of England and six in the Baronetage of the United Kingdom. As of 2014 four of the creations are extant.

The Roberts Baronetcy, of Glassenbury in the County of Kent, was created in the Baronetage of England on 3 July 1620 for Thomas Roberts. The fourth Baronet represented Kent and Maidstone in the House of Commons. The title is said to have become extinct on the death of the sixth Baronet, who left an only daughter, in 1745 (however, see the Roberts Baronetcy of 1809).

The Roberts Baronetcy, of Willesdon in the County of Middlesex, was created in the Baronetage of England on 4 October 1661 for William Roberts, later sitting for Middlesex. The title became extinct on the death of the second Baronet in 1698.

The Roberts Baronetcy, of Bow in the County of Essex, was created in the Baronetage of England on 2 February 1681 for John Roberts. The title became extinct on the death of the second Baronet in 1692

The Roberts Baronetcy, of Britfieldstown in the County of Cork and of the City of Cork, was created in the Baronetage of the United Kingdom on 20 September 1809 for Thomas Roberts. He had earlier claimed the Roberts Baronetcy of 1620. Jane Roberts, only daughter of the sixth Baronet of the 1620 creation, married George Beauclerk, 3rd Duke of St Albans. In circa 1775 she believed that she had discovered the descendants of Thomas, second son of the second Baronet, who lived at Britfieldstown in County Cork, Ireland, and the baronetcy was assumed by the head of that family, Randal Roberts. In 1809 a new patent was passed in favour of his son, the aforementioned Thomas. The baronetcy of 1620 is still claimed by the seventh holder of the 1809 creation, although this claim has not been established at the Herald's College.

The Roberts Baronetcy, of the Army, was created in the Baronetage of the United Kingdom on 15 June 1881. For more information on this creation, see the Earl Roberts.

The Roberts Baronetcy, of Brynwenalt of Kilmaron, was created in the Baronetage of the United Kingdom on 25 July 1908. For more information on this creation, see the Baron Clwyd.

The Roberts Baronetcy, of Milner Field in Bingley in the West Riding of the County of York, was created in the Baronetage of the United Kingdom on 30 November 1909 for James Roberts. He was Chairman of Sir Titus Salt, Sons & Co, of Saltaire, Yorkshire.

The Roberts Baronetcy, of Ecclesall and Queen's Tower in the City of Sheffield and the West Riding of the County of York, was created in the Baronetage of the United Kingdom on 9 September 1919 for Samuel Roberts, Mayor of Sheffield from 1899 to 1900 and conservative member of parliament for Ecclesall from 1902 to 1923. The second Baronet was Lord Mayor of Sheffield from 1919 to 1920 and later represented Hereford and Ecclesall in the House of Commons as a Conservative. The third Baronet sat as Conservative Member of Parliament for Ecclesall and Heeley.

The Roberts Baronetcy, of Martholme in the County of Surrey, was created in the Baronetage of the United Kingdom on 29 January 1931 for George Roberts. The title became extinct on his death in 1950.

Roberts baronets, of Glassenbury (1620)
Sir Thomas Roberts, 1st Baronet (–1627)
Sir Walter Roberts, 2nd Baronet
Sir Howland Roberts, 3rd Baronet (–1661)
Sir Thomas Roberts, 4th Baronet (1658–1706)
Sir Thomas Roberts, 5th Baronet (1689–1730)
Sir Walter Roberts, 6th Baronet (1691–1745)

Roberts baronets, of Willesdon (1661)
Sir William Roberts, 1st Baronet (1638–1688)
Sir William Roberts, 2nd Baronet (1659–1698)

Roberts baronets, of Bow (1681)
Sir John Roberts, 1st Baronet (–1692)

Roberts baronets, of Glassenbury and Britfieldstown (1809)

Sir Thomas Roberts, 1st Baronet (1738–1814)
Sir Walter Roberts, 2nd Baronet (1770–1828)
Sir Thomas Howland Roberts, 3rd Baronet (1804–1864)
Sir Randal Howland Roberts, 4th Baronet (1837–1899)
Sir Howland Roberts, 5th Baronet (1845–1917)
Sir Thomas Langdon Howland Roberts, 6th Baronet (1898–1979)
Sir Gilbert Howland Rookehurst Roberts, 7th Baronet (born 1934)

The heir apparent is the present holder's only son Howland Langdon Roberts (born 1961).

Roberts baronets, of the Army (1881)
see the Earl Roberts

Roberts baronets, of Brynwenalt of Kilmaron (1908)
see the Baron Clwyd

Roberts baronets, of Milner Field (1909)
Sir James Roberts, 1st Baronet (1848–1935)
Sir James Denby Roberts, 2nd Baronet (1904–1973)
Sir William James Denby Roberts, 3rd Baronet (1936–2012)
Sir James Elton Denby Roberts-Buchanan, 4th Baronet (born 1966)

Roberts baronets, of Ecclesall and Queen's Tower (1919)
Sir Samuel Roberts, 1st Baronet (1852–1926)
Sir Samuel Roberts, 2nd Baronet (1882–1955)
Sir Peter Geoffrey Roberts, 3rd Baronet (1912–1985)
Sir Samuel Roberts, 4th Baronet (born 1948)

The heir apparent is the present holder's only son Samuel Roberts (born 1989).

Roberts baronets, of Martholme (1931)
Sir George Roberts, 1st Baronet (1859–1950)

References

Kidd, Charles, Williamson, David (editors). Debrett's Peerage and Baronetage (1990 edition). New York: St Martin's Press, 1990.

Baronetcies in the Baronetage of the United Kingdom
Extinct baronetcies in the Baronetage of England
Extinct baronetcies in the Baronetage of the United Kingdom
1620 establishments in England